Pacasmayo is a city in Northern Peru, in the Pacasmayo province, La Libertad Region. It is located 108 km north of Trujillo city.

Transportation
Panamerican Highway, connects with north and south the country.
Pacasmayo Port, connects to the world by the sea.

Tourism
Pacasmayo beach visited by surfers commonly.

History 
Pacasmayo has been inhabited for over 10,000 years by groups of people collecting their food from the sea. Since before anyone can remember, the beaches of "El Lorito", "El Techito" and "La Peña Larga" have provided food sources to populate Pacasmayo. With the available food from the sea and the forests in the arid mountains (close to the river Jequetepeque) which provides carob trees (or locust beans), wool, and diverse species of animals; Pacasmayo (or Pacasca Mayo in Quechuan) was chosen as a settling place for small tribal groups.

By order of Virrey Teodoro de Croix in the year 1775, the Spanish conquistadors founded Pacasmayo. Since that time it became an important landing for the Spanish crown. The year of 1871 began the construction of the Pacasmayo dock or "muelle de Pacasmayo" and the train Pacasmayo-Chilete, which turned into an important Peruvian coastal port. This work of engineering began the golden age of Pacasmayo which lasted until 1967, the year when the railway stopped running. Since that time, the commercial activity has decreased to the point where now the dock, just as the railway station, are historic monuments. They are evidence of a glorious past that brought with it an economic boom to the city.

The company “Cementos Pacasmayo SA” (Pacasmayo Concrete Inc.), which began in 1959, quickly became the new axis upon which the economy of the city developed. Its presence promoted the development of many economic services such as businesses that transport heavy loads, banks, and commercial stores. All depended on this central industry.

Since the end of the 20th century, the breakwater area, El Faro (The Lighthouse), dominated as the “largest, most navigable wave in the world” and has gained popularity among water-sport fans. At that beach, one can practice surfing, windsurfing, kitesurfing, and paddle-boarding which promotes the growth of foreign visitors who arrive from diverse parts of the world to enjoy these waves.

Further reading 
"Posibilidades de aprovechamiento de aguas subterráneas para las tierras de Santa María (Pampas de Pitura y Guereque)." Ministerio de Fomento y Obras Públicas. Dirección de Irrigación. Autoridad Nacional del Agua, 01 Apr. 1969. Web. 21 Feb. 2017.

References

See also
Pacasmayo Province
La Libertad Region
Colegio Italiano Antonio Raimondi
Óscar Felipe Ventura

Cities in La Libertad Region
Beaches of La Libertad Region
Populated places in La Libertad Region